The Olagbegi family is a royal family in Owo, a city in Ondo State, southwestern Nigeria. Members of the family are descendants of Olagbegi Atanneye I, the Olowo of Owo who reigned between 1913 and 1938. Olagbegi Atanneye was himself a descendant of Ojugbelu Arere, the first traditional ruler of Owo, who was a direct descendant of Oduduwa.

Olateru Olagbegi I, the son of Olagbegi Atanneye, had 300 wives during his reign. After his demise, it was discovered that five of them were still virgins. The family belongs to the Nigerian chieftaincy system.

Notable members
Olagbegi Atanneye I
Olagbegi Atanneye II
Olateru Olagbegi I
Olateru Olagbegi II
Folagbade Olateru Olagbegi III
Gbemi Olateru Olagbegi
Olubunmi Olateru Olagbegi
Bukunyi Olateru-Olagbegi
A Footballer in The Future You'll See

References

 
Yoruba royal families
Nigerian royalty
O